Andrea Carolina Vera Coral (born 10 April 1993) is an Ecuadorian footballer who plays as a goalkeeper for the Ecuador women's national team.

Early life
Vera was born and raised in Quito.

College career
In 2015, Vera moved to the United States. There, she has attended the Hutchinson Community College in Hutchinson, Kansas and the University of Rio Grande in Rio Grande, Ohio.

Club career
Vera has played for Universidad San Francisco in Ecuador and for FC Indiana in the US leagues United Women's Soccer and Women's Premier Soccer League Elite. In July 2020, she was signed by Spanish club UD Collerense to compete in the Segunda División Pro.

International career
Vera was part of the Ecuadorian squad for the 2015 FIFA Women's World Cup and the 2015 Pan American Games.

References

External links
Andrea Vera at BDFútbol
 
 Profile  at FEF
 
 
 http://www.uwssoccer.com

1993 births
Living people
Footballers from Quito
Ecuadorian women's footballers
Women's association football goalkeepers

Hutchinson Community College alumni
College women's soccer players in the United States

University of Rio Grande alumni

F.C. Indiana players
UD Collerense (women) players
Women's Premier Soccer League Elite players
Ecuador women's international footballers
2015 FIFA Women's World Cup players
Pan American Games competitors for Ecuador
Footballers at the 2015 Pan American Games
Ecuadorian expatriate footballers
Ecuadorian expatriate sportspeople in the United States
Expatriate women's soccer players in the United States
Ecuadorian expatriate sportspeople in Spain
Expatriate women's footballers in Spain
21st-century Ecuadorian women